Krebs Pigments and Chemical Company was founded in 1902 by Henrik J. Krebs and was a manufacturer of lithopone and titanium dioxide.

History
The company was founded in 1902 by Henrik J. Krebs in Newport, Delaware. After the death of Krebs in 1929 the company was purchased by DuPont.

In 1931 DuPont formed a joint venture with Commercial Pigments Corporation to scale up titanium dioxide production for use as a white pigment, to compete against National Lead. The joint venture was named the Krebs Pigment and Color Corporation.

By 1933 National Lead and DuPont ended their patent litigation and cross licensed their patents and synthetic routes. In 1934, DuPont purchased the Commercial Pigments Corporation's 30 percent stake in the company for $7,420,000. In 1935 Phelps was named the assistant general manager. It then became a wholly owned subsidiary of DuPont. DuPont then called it the "Krebs Pigments Department" and by 1942 it became just the "Pigments Department". DuPont then liquidated all Krebs Pigment and Color Corporation's assets and transferred them to the DuPont Company.

References

Chemical companies of the United States
DuPont subsidiaries
Chemical companies established in 1902
1902 establishments in Delaware
Manufacturing companies disestablished in 1935
1935 disestablishments in Delaware
1929 mergers and acquisitions